Bhattacharya or Bhattacharyya may refer to 
Bhattacharya (surname) 
Bhattacharyya angle in statistics
Bhattacharyya distance in statistics
8348 Bhattacharyya, an asteroid
Harasankar Bhattacharya Institute of Technology and Mining in West Bengal, India
Nani Bhattacharya Smarak Mahavidyalaya, a general degree college in Mangalbari, India